Garumuni Arthur Wickremaratne de Zoysa (?- 1949) was a Ceylonese politician. He was elected to the first Parliament of Ceylon in 1947 representing the United National Party as the second member for the Ambalangoda-Balapitiya electorate.

References

Date of birth missing
Alumni of Royal College, Colombo
United National Party politicians
Members of the 1st Parliament of Ceylon
1949 deaths